Little Altcar is a civil parish and a village in Sefton, Merseyside, England. It contains five buildings that are recorded in the National Heritage List for England as designated listed buildings, all of which are listed at Grade II. This grade is the lowest of the three gradings given to listed buildings and is applied to "buildings of national importance and special interest". Originally rural, the parish has been partly occupied by housing.  The listed buildings are farmhouses and farm buildings.

References
Citations

Sources

Listed buildings in Merseyside
Lists of listed buildings in Merseyside
Listed buildings in Little Altcar